1. FC Femina is a Hungarian women's football team competing in the Hungarian First Division. 

Founded in 1970, Femina is the most successful team in the championship with 10 titles between 1988 and 2008, including two 3-year winning streaks in 2000–03 and 2005–08. The following two seasons marked a decline with the club's worst rankings yet, while in 2011 Femina was 3rd. Femina has been less successful in the national Cup, with just one title to make a double in 1996.

Femina was the first team to represent Hungary in the UEFA Women's Cup. Its major success in its six appearances so far was reaching the last 16 in 2007.

Honours
 10 Hungarian Leagues: 1988, 1991, 1996, 1997, 2001, 2002, 2003, 2006, 2007, 2008
 1 Hungarian Cup: 1996

Record in European competitions

References

Women's football clubs in Hungary
Association football clubs established in 1970
Sport in Budapest
1970 establishments in Hungary